Lok Shakti (lit. People's Power) is a political party in India. Lok Shakti was one of several parties that were formed when the Janata Dal crumbled in the mid-1990s. LS was formed in February 1997 after Ramakrishna Hegde was expelled from Janata Dal. Lok Shakti emerged as a major party in Karnataka. It was a founding member of the National Democratic Alliance.

Merger 

Before the 1999 general election, faction led by then Chief Minister of Karnataka J. H. Patel lent support to the National Democratic Alliance, leading to the split in the Janata Dal. This caused the formation of Janata Dal (Secular) under H. D. Deve Gowda, who wanted to remain equidistant from both national parties; and Janata Dal (United) under Sharad Yadav. 

Janata Dal (United) was formed with the merger of the Sharad Yadav faction of the Janata Dal, the Lok Shakti and the Samata Party. On 30 October 2003, the Samata Party led by George Fernandes and Nitish Kumar merged with the Janata Dal. The merged entity was called Janata Dal (United) with the arrow symbol of Janata Dal (United) and the green and white flag of the Samata Party. But Election Commission of India refused the merger of Samata Party. Brahmanand Mandal became the president, but he is suffering from Alzheimer's disease and not physically well so Uday Mandal became President and he has taken charge of the Samata Party. The uniting force is believed to be common opposition to Rashtriya Janata Dal in Bihar especially after the Rashtriya Janata Dal welcomed Samata Party rebels like Raghunath Jha into the party.

Party Presidents 
Ramakrishna Hegde

State Units

Karnataka

Presidents 
Jeevaraj Alva (1999)

References

1997 establishments in India
1999 disestablishments in India
Defunct political parties in Karnataka
Former member parties of the National Democratic Alliance
Janata Dal
Janata Dal (United)
Political parties disestablished in 1999
Political parties established in 1997
1997 establishments in Karnataka